Robert Bloch's Psychos is a 1997 horror anthology that was being edited by American writer Robert Bloch until his death in 1994. Martin H. Greenberg completed the editorial work posthumously.

List of stories
The book featured the following stories by contributing authors from the Horror Writers Association:

 "Autopsy Room Four" by Stephen King
 "Haunted" by Charles L. Grant
 "Out There in the Darkness" by Ed Gorman
 "Please Help Me" by Richard Christian Matheson
 "The Lesser of Two Evils" by Denise M. Bruchman
 "Point of Intersection" by Dominick Cancilla
 "Doctor, Lawyer, Kansas City Chief" by Brent Monahan
 "Grandpa's Head" by Lawrence Watt-Evans
 "Lonelyhearts" by Esther M. Friesner
 "Lighting the Corpses" by Del Stone Jr.
 "Echoes" by Cindie Geddes
 "Lifeline" by Yvonne Navarro
 "Blameless" by David Niall Wilson
 "Deep Down There" by Clark Perry
 "Knacker Man" by Richard Parks
 "So You Wanna Be a Hitman" by Gary Jonas
 "The Rug" by Edo van Belkom
 "Interview with a Psycho" by Billie Sue Mosiman
 "Icewall" by William D. Gagliani
 "A Southern Night" by Jane Yolen
 "The Forgiven" by Stephen M. Rainey
 "Safe" by Gary A. Braunbeck

References

1997 anthologies
Horror anthologies
Martin H. Greenberg anthologies
Works by Robert Bloch
Books published posthumously
Cemetery Dance Publications books